Stephens College is a private women's college in Columbia, Missouri. It is the second-oldest women's educational establishment that is still a women's college in the United States. It was founded on August 24, 1833, as the Columbia Female Academy. In 1856, David H. Hickman helped secure the college's charter under the name The Columbia Female Baptist Academy In the late 19th century it was renamed Stephens College after James L. Stephens endowed the college with $20,000. From 1937 to 1943, its Drama Department became renowned under its chairman and teacher, the actress Maude Adams, James M. Barrie's first American Peter Pan. The Warehouse Theater is the major performance venue for the college. The campus includes a National Historic District: Stephens College South Campus Historic District. It enrolled 593 students in Fall 2021.

Location
Columbia is known as "College Town, USA" because of the 36,000 college students attending Stephens, the University of Missouri and Columbia College. The Stephens campus is near downtown Columbia.

Academics
The college follows a liberal arts curriculum and has two schools: Health Sciences and Arts & Humanities 

In addition to undergraduate programs, Stephens offers the following graduate degrees: Master of Education in Counseling, Master of Fine Arts in Television and Screenwriting, and Master in Physician Assistant Studies.

Campus life
Stephens is one of four women's colleges, along with Bennett College, Spelman College, and Brenau University, to have sororities on its campus. Sigma Sigma Sigma and Kappa Delta, both of which are National Panhellenic Conference sororities, have on-campus chapters. The sororities are governed by the Panhellenic Council and the Junior Panhellenic Council. Stephens students can also join historically Black or Asian sororities at the nearby University of Missouri campus.

There are also about a dozen academic honor societies on campus: Mortar Board, Psi Chi, Alpha Lambda Delta, Sigma Tau Delta, Tri-Beta, Kappa Delta Pi, Phi Alpha Delta, and others. Although Stephens College is no longer a two-year institution, it is the location of the Alpha chapter of Phi Theta Kappa International Honor Society of the Two-Year College.

The student newspaper is named Stephens Life and is online with a magazine printed once a semester. The college's literary magazine is named Harbinger and is released each spring.

Stephens opened pet-friendly residence halls in 2004. The college also allows students to foster shelter animals in exchange for scholarships.

The Warehouse Theatre Company is a student-run playhouse on campus which stages an average of four different productions per academic season.

Citizen Jane Film Festival 

The Citizen Jane Film Festival was an annual film festival established at Stephens College. The festival was first held October 17–19, 2008. Films were chosen that showcased women behind and in front of the camera. Though the festival has been discontinued, Citizen Jane continues in the form of a lecture series hosted by the Stephens College digital filmmaking program.

Athletics
The Stephens athletic teams are called the Stars. The college is a member of the National Association of Intercollegiate Athletics (NAIA), primarily competing in the American Midwest Conference (AMC) since the 2008–09 academic year. The Stars previously competed as an NAIA Independent from 2004–05 to 2007–08. Prior joining the NAIA, Stephens was also a member of the National Collegiate Athletic Association (NCAA): in the Division III ranks from 1994–95 (when the school re-instated back its athletics program) to 2003–04; and in the Division II ranks from about 1982–83 to 1986–87, before transitioning to club status until discontinuing the athletics program after the 1988–89 school year.

Stephens competes in four intercollegiate varsity sports: basketball, soccer, softball and volleyball. Former sports included cross country. Club sports include competitive dance and esports, which is the first varsity esports team at an all-women's college.

Alumnae
The Stephens College Alumnae Association has more than 20,000 members internationally.  Alumnae are found in every state.

Notable alumnae

 Stephanie Beatriz, actress
 Paddy Bowden, psychotherapist, wife of Iron Maiden singer Bruce Dickinson
 Nancy Elizabeth Brown, Vice Admiral, United States Navy
 Shirley Clarke, filmmaker
 Nancy Cozean, former journalist and politician
 Joan Crawford, actress (did not complete first year)
 Frances Crowe, peace activist
 Leslie Easterbrook, actress; best known for her role as Debbie Callahan in the Police Academy series
 Shirley Adele Field, Oregon legislator and judge
 Susan Flannery, soap actress on CBS The Bold & the Beautiful, retired December 2012 after 25 years
 Karith Foster, stand-up comedian and radio personality
 Wally Funk, aviator and astronaut
 Tammy Grimes, actress and singer
 Anne Gwynne, actress
 Corky Hale, jazz musician
 Joan Robinson Hill, equestrienne and socialite
 Eva Johnston, classical scholar; first American woman to receive a Doctoral degree from the University of Konigsburg; second female Professor and first Dean of Women at the University of Missouri
 Jeane Kirkpatrick, first female U.S. Ambassador to the U.N.
 Ashley Litton, former Miss Missouri USA
 Ginny McSwain, casting director and voice director
 Bonnie McElveen-Hunter, businesswoman and former U.S. Ambassador to Finland
 Marjie Millar, actress
 Leslie Adrienne Miller, poet
 Elizabeth Mitchell, actress
 Martha Beall Mitchell, wife of former U.S. Attorney General John Mitchell
 Jean Muir, actress, first performer added to the Hollywood Blacklist
 Alanna Nash, journalist
 Carrie Nye, actress
 Lyndsey Olson, Saint Paul City Attorney
Annie Potts, television and film actress
 Emily J. Reynolds, Secretary of the U.S. Senate
 Virginia Shehee, first woman to serve in the Louisiana State Senate
 Julie Suk, poet
 Jennifer Tilly, actress
 Dawn Wells, actress
 Virginia Welles, actress
 Glad Robinson Youse, composer; Stephens College offers a Glad Robinson Youse Scholarship
 Paula Zahn, journalist
 Paula Zima, artist

Historic buildings

Firestone Baars Chapel
The Firestone Baars Chapel was designed by world-famous Finnish architect Eero Saarinen who also designed the Gateway Arch in St. Louis. The chapel symbolizes commitment to individual spiritual development and worship. The chapel is used for meditation, religious services, vespers, weddings, memorials and campus programs.

Historic Senior Hall

Historic Senior Hall dates back to 1841, when Oliver Parker bought the      tract of land on which the college was first located. In 1857, the Columbia Baptist Female College, which later became Stephens College, acquired the building. Until 1918, Historic Senior Hall was the only dormitory at the college. It was the tradition for the President of the Civic Association (now the Student Government Association) to occupy the first floor room just north of the Waugh Street entrance. Many generations of students feel this building is their tie to the past. A complete restoration of Historic Senior Hall began in the spring of 1987, and the building was rededicated in the spring of 1990. Senior Hall was placed on the National Register of Historic Places in 1977.

References

Further reading

External links

 Official website
 Official athletics website

 
1833 establishments in Missouri
Educational institutions established in 1833
Universities and colleges in Columbia, Missouri
Music schools in Columbia, Missouri
Private universities and colleges in Missouri
Liberal arts colleges in Missouri
Women's universities and colleges in the United States
Performing arts in Columbia, Missouri